Aleksandra Goncharova (born 26 October 1992) is a Russian road and track cyclist, who last rode for UCI Women's Team . After finishing 11th in 2011 she won in both at the 2014 UEC European Track Championships and 2015 UEC European Track Championships the silver medal in the team pursuit.

Career results
2011
 3rd Team pursuit, UEC European Under-23 Track Championships (with Elena Lichmanova and Lidia Malakhova)
2014
 UEC European Under-23 Track Championships
1st Team pursuit (with Tamara Balabolina, Alexandra Chekina and Gulnaz Badykova)
2nd Individual pursuit
2nd Scratch
 2nd  Team pursuit, UEC European Track Championships (with Tamara Balabolina, Alexandra Chekina, Irina Molicheva and Evgenia Romanyuta)
2015
 2nd  Team pursuit, UEC European Track Championships
 2nd Scratch race, Memorial of Alexander Lesnikov
2017
 1st Omnium, Grand Prix Minsk
 3rd Omnium, Grand Prix of Moscow
2019
 1st  Road race, National Road Championships

References

External links

1992 births
Russian female cyclists
Living people
Cyclists from Moscow
Russian track cyclists